California X are a punk rock band formed in 2012 in Amherst, Massachusetts by Lemuel Gurtowsky. They released their debut album in 2013 on Don Giovanni Records. Their second album, Nights In The Dark, was released in 2015, once again via Don Giovanni Records.

Discography

LPs

EPs

External links
 Don Giovanni Records Official Website

References

Musical groups established in 2012
Don Giovanni Records artists
2012 establishments in Massachusetts